Pravithanam PM Devasia was a Malayalam poet. He penned five Christian Mahakavyam. His best known works are Israel Vamsam and Rajakkanmar. He was a teacher by profession. He led a very austere life and received many accolades for his work. He died at the age of 93.

See also

Palai

References
 http://www.palai.com/literature.htm

Year of death missing
Malayalam poets
Year of birth missing
People from Pala, Kerala
Indian male poets
Poets from Kerala